Hossein Kheyri is an Iranian football midfielder who plays for Rah Ahan in the Iran Pro League.

Club career

Rah Ahan
Kheyri joined Rah Ahan in summer 2015 with a contract until 2018. He made his professional debut for Rah Ahan on October 16, 2015 in 5-0 win against Esteghlal Ahvaz as a starter.

Club career statistics

References

External links
 Hossein Kheyri at IranLeague.ir

1994 births
Living people
Iranian footballers
People from Tehran
Rah Ahan players
Association football defenders